Rough Translation is an American podcast from NPR that tells stories from around the world that have relevance to a U.S. audience. It debuted in 2017 and is hosted by Gregory Warner, a former NPR foreign correspondent.

Program 
NPR describes the program as "a podcast that tells stories from far off places that hit close to home."

The first season had seven episodes, and the second an additional five. The third season, the first to have an explicit theme, was about rebels and had 26 episodes. The fourth season, about scandal, had seven episodes. The fifth season, about cultural identity, had eight episodes. The sixth season began with a seven-part series about the civilian-military cultural divide. It continued through April 2022. The seventh season, about work culture, began  in June 2022.

Reception 
The podcast has received positive critical reception.

References

External links 

 

2017 podcast debuts
Audio podcasts
NPR programs
American podcasts
Educational podcasts